Barry "Baz" Thomson is an English musician, best known for being the lead and rhythm guitarist for death metal band Bolt Thrower until their disbandment in 2016. He co-founded the band in 1986, and was also the main songwriter of the band. He remained in Bolt Thrower until they broke up in 2016, following the death of drummer Martin Kearns the year before. Thompson also did some backing vocals on the Benediction album, Grind Bastard.

Equipment 
 BC Rich Warlock,
 Jackson Kelly,
 Boss GX700,
 Marshall 9040 200w power amp,
 4 x Marshall 4x12

References 

English heavy metal guitarists
Bolt Thrower members
Living people
Year of birth missing (living people)